Loubet Coast is the portion of the west coast of Graham Land in Antarctic Peninsula, extending 158 km between Cape Bellue to the northeast and Bourgeois Fjord to the southwest. South of Loubet Coast is Fallières Coast, north is Graham Coast.

The coast is named after Émile Loubet, President of France during the exploration of the area by the French Antarctic Expedition under Jean-Baptiste Charcot in January 1905.

Location

British mapping in 1976 - 78.

Maps

 British Antarctic Territory.  Scale 1:200000 topographic map. DOS 610 Series, Sheet W 66 64.  Directorate of Overseas Surveys, Tolworth, UK, 1976.
 British Antarctic Territory.  Scale 1:200000 topographic map. DOS 610 Series, Sheet W 66 66.  Directorate of Overseas Surveys, Tolworth, UK, 1976.
 British Antarctic Territory.  Scale 1:200000 topographic map. DOS 610 Series, Sheet W 67 66.  Directorate of Overseas Surveys, Tolworth, UK, 1978.

References
 Composite Antarctic Gazetteer.

 
Coasts of Graham Land